Drohobych Oblast (December 4, 1939May 21, 1959) was an oblast in the Ukrainian SSR. It had a territory of 9.6 thousands of km³ and, as of 1956, population of 853,000.

History
Drohobych Oblast was one of six oblasts (the other five are Lviv Oblast, Rivne Oblast, Stanislav (Ivano-Frankivsk) Oblast, Tarnopil (Ternopil) Oblast, and Volyn Oblast) established on the territory of West Ukraine following the 1939 invasion of Poland.

On November 27, 1939 eight powiats of Lwow voivodeship and two powiats of Stanislawow voivodeship were designated for the creation of Drohobych Oblast, establishment of which was confirmed on December 4, 1939. 
 Dobromyl
 Drohobych
 Lesko
 Mostyska
 Peremyshl
 Rudky
 Sambir
 Zhydachiv
 Stryi
 Turka

On January 17, 1940 the oblast was split into 30 raions and five municipalities: Bircha (village), Boryslav (city), Vysotsko-Vyzhnie (village), Dobromyl (city), Drohobych (city), Dubliany (village), Zhydachiv (city), Zhuravno (village), Komarno (city), Krukenych (village), Lavochne (village), Lysko (city), Medenytsia (town), Medyka (village), Mostyska (city), Mykolaiv (city), Streliski Novi (town), Peremyshl (city), Pidbuzh (village), Rudky (city), Sambir (city), Skole (city), Staryi Sambir (city), Strilky (village), Stryi (city), Sudova Vyshnia (city), Turka (city), Ustryki Dolni (town), Khodoriv (city), Khyriv (town). Municipalities were Boryslav, Drohobych, Peremyshl, Sambir, Stryi. On August 15, 1940 Boryslav Raion was disestablished. On November 11, 1940, couple of raions were re-designated: Vysotsko-Vyzhnie to Borynia (village) and Lavochne-Slavsko (village).

After the oblast was retaken from German occupation on August 15, 1944, three raions were renamed: Zhydechuv to Zhydachiv, Streliski Novi to Novi Strelyshcha, and Ustryki Dolni to Nyzhnio Ustryki. In March 1945, Bircha Raion, Lisko Raion, and most of Peremyshl Raion (including the city of Przemyśl) were transferred to Poland. In place of the rest of former Peremyshl Raion, the Nyzhankovychy Raion (centered at a town of Nyzhankovychy) was created. On May 15, 1948 whole Medyka Raion was transferred to Poland as well. On July 15, 1951, the municipality of Truskavets was created. On December 10, 1951, Nyzhnio Ustryky Raion was followed along with another transferring process to Poland (see 1951 Polish-Soviet territorial exchange). In July 1957, Khyriv Raion was disestablished. Five more raions were liquidated on January 21, 1959: Dubliany, Zhuravno, Krukenych, Novi Strelyshcha, and Strilky. Sometime before May 1959, Pidbuzh Raion was liquidated, however Boryslav Raion was reinstated. On May 1, 1959, there were 19 raions and five municipalities. On May 21, 1959, Drohobych Oblast was merged with Lviv Oblast.

Governors
Governors or chairmen of regional executive committee:
 December 8, 1939 – June 30, 1941 – Danylo Lezhenko (evacuated)
 August 1941 – 1942 – Eduard Edamczyk (kreishauptman)
 1942 – 1944 – Gargens (kreishauptman)
 1944 – 1946 – Danylo Lezhenko (returned)
 1946 – 1947 – Ivan Kravchuk
 1947 – 1957 – Ivan Yavorskyi (until August 21)
 1957 – May 1959 – Illia Tarnavskyi

External links
 Drohobych Oblast. World historical portal. (amateurs site) 

 
Soviet occupation of Eastern Poland 1939–1941
History of Lviv Oblast
Former oblasts of Ukraine